WDBO (580 AM) is a commercial radio station broadcasting a news/talk radio format. Licensed to Orlando, Florida, the station is owned by Cox Media Group. The studios and offices are located on North John Young Parkway in Orlando.

WDBO’s transmitter power is 5,000 watts. At night, it uses a directional antenna to protect other stations on AM 580. The transmitter tower is off West Kennedy Boulevard in Maitland. Programming is also heard on FM translator W297BB at 107.3 MHz.

History

Early years
It was first licensed to Rollins College in Winter Park. In its early years, it used a number of frequencies, but by 1933, it settled on 580 kilocycles. In 1935, it got a boost in power from 250 watts to 1,000 watts. It was owned by the Orlando Broadcasting Company, and was a network affiliate of CBS Radio. WDBO carried the CBS line up of dramas, comedies, news, sports, soap operas, game shows and big band broadcasts during the "Golden Age of Radio".

In 1949, WDBO-FM (92.3 FM) was put on the air as a simulcast of WDBO. Five years later, WDBO-TV came on the air, the first television station in Central Florida. In 1982, the firm that owned WDBO-AM-FM-TV, The Outlet Company, sold the radio stations to Katz Broadcasting. (The TV station eventually became WKMG-TV.) When the stations were sold, WDBO-FM was re-formatted as a country music station, "K92FM", with the call sign WWKA.

Middle of the road to adult contemporary to talk
As network programming moved from radio to television in the 1950s, WDBO switched to a full service middle of the road format of popular adult music, news and sports. The station also joined the ABC News Radio Network, and slowly added more talk radio programs. By the 1980s, "58 WDBO" began to scale back on MOR music, and in 1985, the station dropped MOR entirely switching to adult contemporary, also along with news, music, and sports.  The change in music came shortly after Leesburg's WHLY switched from its adult contemporary format to Top 40.

When the 1990s began rolling along, WDBO was airing a mix of news/talk and adult contemporary. But in 1994, the station dropped music entirely and it became "NewsTalk 580 WDBO", which for years had been Greater Orlando's highest-rated AM news/talk station.  In 1997, WDBO and WWKA were acquired by Cox Radio. In August 2011, Cox ended the classic rock format on WHTQ (96.5 FM), and gave it the call sign WDBO-FM, becoming a simulcast of WDBO. (WDBO has initially heard on that station's HD-2 subchannel beginning in late February 2008.) The news/talk station eventually re-branded, using the FM frequency exclusively as "NewsTalk 96-5 WDBO".

Switch to sports
On November 12, 2012, the simulcast ended when WDBO re-launched as a sports radio station affiliated with ESPN Radio, while WDBO-FM continued the news/talk programming on its own. The ESPN Radio Network had been dropped previously by WHOO (1080 AM), which switched its affiliation to NBC Sports Radio. WDBO carried the full ESPN Radio schedule, except for a local program weekday afternoons hosted by Scott Anez.

WDBO remained the flagship radio station of the Orlando Magic basketball team until iHeartMedia's WYGM (740 AM) became the home of the Magic at the start of the 2018–2019 season.

Return to talk
On June 24, 2020, Cox Radio announced that WDBO would drop its sports programming to return to news/talk.  In addition, WDBO-FM flipped to a Spanish-language contemporary hits format as WOEX, "Exitos 96.5". To give listeners in Orlando and its adjacent communities the option to hear WDBO programming on FM, Cox added a simulcast via FM translator W297BB (107.3 FM) on June 29. With the addition of the translator, the station rebranded as "WDBO 107.3 FM and 580 AM".

In September 2021, Cox Media announced reductions of the WDBO staff; morning anchor Ray Caputo, evening anchor Tony Marino and late morning talk host Darrell Moody were released.  The noon news hour was also replaced with talk programming.

Programming
Weekdays begin with Orlando's Morning News anchored by Scott Anez. There's also an hour-long local newsblock at 6 p.m.  A local conservative talk show is heard in middays, hosted by Mark Kaye.  A local sports show airs in the evening, "Live, Local and Loud" with Nick Gryniewicz and Jerry Daniels. The rest of the weekday schedule is made up of nationally syndicated talk shows from Sean Hannity, Brian Kilmeade, Dana Loesch, Eric Erickson and Markley, Van Camp & Robbins.

Weekends include shows on money, health, law, real estate, home improvement, gardening and cars. A technology show with Kim Komando is heard Sunday evenings. Some weekend hours are paid brokered programming. Most hours begin with world and national news from ABC News Radio.

References

External links
Official website
WDBO history

FCC History Cards for WDBO

DBO (AM)
Cox Media Group
Radio stations established in 1924
News and talk radio stations in the United States
1924 establishments in Florida